The Prahran Cricket Club is an Australian cricket club based in Prahran, an inner-city suburb of Melbourne, Victoria. They play in Victorian Premier Cricket, the highest competition in the state. The club was originally known as Hawksburn Cricket Club, being founded in 1879. The club plays its home matches at Toorak Park in Armadale.

International players from Prahran 
Sam Loxton

References

External links
Victorian Premier Cricket website

Victorian Premier Cricket clubs
Cricket clubs in Melbourne
Sport in the City of Stonnington